Vasyl Nikolaevich Grytsak (born 17 February 1961, village Horynhrad Druhyi, Rivne Raion, Rivne Oblast. People's Deputy of Ukraine of V and VI convocations, Lieutenant General of police, Deputy Chairman of the State Migration Service of Ukraine, Candidate of Legal Sciences, docent, State employee of the first rank, Honored Economist of Ukraine, Laureate of the State Prize in the field of science and technology. Member of hostilities, was awarded honors of the President of Ukraine - "Defender of the Fatherland".

Biography
From 1979 to 1981 he served in the Soviet Army, Alma-Ata, in / h 78460, military transport regiment of aviation and communication of the Central Asia Military District.

Higher education. In 1986 he graduated from the Ukrainian National University of Water and Environmental Engineering (Rivne), in 1999 — National University Odesa Law Academy. Building engineer, Lawyer-jurist.

From 1986 till 1995 – had been occupying engineering and senior positions in the enterprises of Kharkiv city as well as the position of the head of the project department of the Ministry of Internal Affairs (Ukraine) in Kharkiv oblast, Assistant Chief of the Ministry of Internal Affairs of Ukraine in Kharkiv region on a part-time basis. 
From 1995 till 2001 — the assistant to the rector of the University of Internal Affairs - Head of the Capital Construction department, Vice-Rector for Economics and material and technical support of National University of Internal Affairs of Ukraine (Kharkiv).
In 1999 he has defended his doctoral thesis at the special council of the National University Odesa Law Academy.

From 2001 till 2005 - Head of the Central Administration of material and technical and military support of the Ministry of Internal Affairs of Ukraine, Head of the department of resource support of the Ministry of Internal Affairs of Ukraine.
From 2006 till 2012 – People's Deputy of Ukraine for Party of Regions the V (2006-2007) and VI (2007-2012) convocations of the Verkhovna Rada of Ukraine. The Committee on Legislative Support of the Law Enforcement of the Supreme Council of Ukraine. He developed about 80 draft laws of Ukraine, 35 of which were signed by the President of Ukraine
.<ref name="Левый Берег">In the new year, Ukrainians can not be allowed into the EU without biometric passports'. Left Bank, 30 November 2012</ref>

From 2011, Vasyl Grytsak had been co-author of the idea of a Ukrainian police even before the current Minister of Internal Affairs of Ukraine Arsen Avakov expressed interest in the creation of a new police patrol instead of the police. Authors of the bill wanted to provide a high control over police activities. «Cancel of some titles based on the fact that they are not needed. The European experience tells us about it again. A salary increase will lead to the gradual elimination of the corruption, which, unfortunately, cannot be eradicated in one day», - said V.Grytsak.Militia will become Police and will get a new super economical and convenient form (PHOTO). Bagnet, July 3, 2012
From 2013 till 2014 – Deputy Chairman of the State Migration Service of Ukraine.
From 2008 to present – President of the International public organization "Union of Generals of Internal Affairs of Ukraine".

Activities in the Verkhovna Rada
In 2006, the People's Deputy of Ukraine V. Grytsak introduced the Draft Law of Ukraine "On the national demographic register"  No. 2170 from 14.09.2006. Since that moment, they have begun to solve legislatively the issues of a new passport system of Ukraine and identification documents, according to the new ICAO standards.

By Resolution of the Verkhovna Rada of Ukraine No. 719-V Ukrainian passport was converted to the European standards for traveling abroad. V.N. Grytsak developed the Law "On the priority directions of the activity of law enforcement bodies of Ukraine» № 2389-VI. Also he developed the Law "On security activity» (No. 4616-VI), which was successfully adopted. For the first time in Ukraine, legal, organizational and economic basis of implementation of the security activities of all forms of property, rights of individuals and entities in the implementation of security activity are settled.

Since 2011, Vasyl Grytsak had been co-author of the idea of the National Police of Ukraine even before the current Ministry of Internal Affairs (Ukraine) Arsen Avakov expressed the interest in the creation of a new police patrol instead of the militia. Two fundamental draft laws "On Police" and "On State Service of the rule of law" were developed by V.Grytsak. On the basis of these laws, the Law "On the National Police of Ukraine" was adopted in 2014. The authors of the bills wanted to provide a high control over the police activities. «Cancel of some titles is based on the fact that they are not needed. The European experience tells us about it again. A salary increase will lead to the gradual elimination of the corruption, which, unfortunately, cannot be eradicated in one day», - said V.Grytsak.Militia will become Police and will get a new super economical and convenient form (PHOTO).Bagnet, July 3, 2012

18.05.2012 , V.Grytsak introduced a draft law "On the Unified State demographic Register and documents that confirm citizenship of Ukraine, according to the personality and its special status." The law was adopted in 2012 (No. 5492-VI). Thus, Ukraine has finally brought its legislation to the international standards in the field of identification documents. According to the estimates of the world's experts, there is no more qualitative document in this field in Europe.

Also, V.Grytsak developed a number of laws "On the organization of the legal framework to combat an organized crime and corruption". He took an active part in the discussions and voted for the significant laws in the field of finance, economics, law, foreign and domestic policy, and others. According to the experts, he was one of the most disciplined and effective deputies in the V and VI convocations of the Verkhovna Rada of Ukraine.

 Social activity
From 2008 to present – Chairman of the International public organization "Union of Generals of Internal Affairs of Ukraine". The civil servant of the first rank. President of the Kharkiv regional sport club "Centurion". The chairman of the public organization "Gunsmiths Union of Ukraine".

 Scientific activity
Candidate of Legal Sciences, docent, Laureate of the State Prize of Ukraine in the Science and Technology. Laureate of the International Congress ID World "For the significant contribution to the development of e-passports worldwide. Ukrainian foreign passport" November 18, 2008 (Milan, Italy). The decision of the tender committee of the OSCE, the European Commission and Interpol.

Selected works
 Grytsak V.N. Povazhnyuk V.G. Department of the resource support of the Ministry of Interior of Ukraine - Kyiv: Ukraine Press, 2007-166 p.
 Grytsak V.N. Golub Y.N., Ilyin A.V., Bolshakov V.N., Fedko V.F. Weapons of Special Forces - Kyiv Ltd "Image Print" with 2008-271p.
 Grytsak V.N. Sichik O.V. My village – my soul: chronicle of villages Goringrad-I and Goringrad-II Rіvne region. History. Facts. Modernity. Kharkiv: FO-P Zalogіn S.O., 2013. - 336 p.
The author of over 40 scientific articles on issues of law, migration policy and the economy in the scientific editions of Ukraine and other countries.

Featured articles
 Grytsak V. Topical issues of state and law. (National University Odesa Law Academy) 1999.
 Grytsak V. Legal Gazette. (Odessa State Academy of Law) 1999.
 Grytsak V.N Scientific Bulletin of the National Academy of Internal Affairs of Ukraine, 1999.
 Grytsak V. "Bulletin of the University of Internal Affairs of Ukraine", 1999.
 Grytsak V. The scientific works of the National University Odesa Law Academy, 2003.
 Grytsak V. Our right. (National University of Internal Affairs of Ukraine), 2003.
 Grytsak V. Actual problems of modern science in the research of young scientists. (National University of Internal Affairs of Ukraine), 2005.
 Grytsak V. "Scientific Bulletin of Kyiv National University of Internal Affairs of Ukraine", 2006.
 Grytsak V. "Bulletin of the Academy of the Prosecutor's Office of Ukraine", 2007.
 Grytsak V.N. Forum of law. (Kharkiv National University of Internal Affairs) - the Committee on Legal Sciences, 2007.
 Grytsak V.'' "Bulletin of Kharkiv National University. Series "Law". 2008.

Honors
 Honors of the President of Ukraine - "Defender of the Fatherland".
 Laureate of the State Prize in the field of science and technology (2003)
 Honorary Diploma of the Government of Ukraine (2003)
 Nominal weapon of Ministry of Internal Affairs (Ukraine)(2003)
 Honored Economist of Ukraine (2004)
 Nominal weapon of Ministry of Defence of Ukraine (2004)
 Diploma of the Verkhovna Rada of Ukraine (2011)
 Awards of Ministry of Internal Affairs (Ukraine) ("Cross of Glory", "Law and honor", "Honored Worker of MIA of Ukraine", "Knight of the Law", "For the safety of the people", "For the development of science, technology and education I-III degrees").
 "For Merit" of the Ministry of Justice (Ukraine).
 "For Merit" Ministry of Emergency Situations of Ukraine.
 Marked by the departmental awards: Ministry of Internal Affairs of the Russian Federation, Belarus, Poland, Hungary, Moldova, Kazakhstan, Armenia and other countries.
 He was awarded by the highest church awards for the reconstruction and restoration of Holy Trinity Church (200 years) in the village Goryngrad I Rivne oblast, as well as Orthodox churches in Kharkiv, Poltava, Kyiv, Rivne, Volyn and Transcarpathian regions.

Family
Wife - Natalya Grytsak., children:

 Marina;
 Igor;
 Alexander.

Brother: Vitaly Nikolaevich Grytsak (1964), he served in Afghanistan (1983-1985), awarded by the medal "For Service in the Battle", ex-chief of the Internal Affairs of Khmelnytskyi Oblast (2007-2008), ex-head of the Department of Protection at the Ministry of Internal Affairs of Ukraine (2008-2010), the deputy of Rivne Regional Council (2010-2015.), Major General of police.

Hobbies
In his youth – boxing, wrestling, now - football, the history of military battles and the history of the Ancient World.

References

External links
 
 
 

1961 births
Living people
People from Rivne Oblast
Ukrainian police officers
Fifth convocation members of the Verkhovna Rada
Sixth convocation members of the Verkhovna Rada
Party of Regions politicians
Odesa Law Academy alumni
Laureates of the State Prize of Ukraine in Science and Technology
Laureates of the Honorary Diploma of the Verkhovna Rada of Ukraine
Recipients of the Honorary Diploma of the Cabinet of Ministers of Ukraine